Dikbas is a common name for several plants and may refer to:

 Dombeya rotundifolia
 Lannea discolor